Vyacheslav Ivanov may refer to:

Vyacheslav Ivanov (poet) (1866–1949), Russian Symbolist poet and philosopher
Vyacheslav Ivanov (philologist) (1929–2017), Russian semiotician specializing among other in Indo-European studies
Vyacheslav Ivanov (rower) (born 1938), Russian rower who became the first three-time Olympic gold medalist in the single scull event
Vyacheslav Ivanov (footballer) (born 1987), Ukrainian association football player